Wyken is a hamlet in the English county of Shropshire.

Wyken is located on the A454 road between Bridgnorth and Wolverhampton. The nearest village is Worfield.

See also
Listed buildings in Worfield

External links

Hamlets in Shropshire